× Wilsonara, abbreviated as Wils. in the horticultural trade, is the nothogenus for intergeneric hybrids between the three orchid genera Cochlioda, Odontoglossum and Oncidium (Cda. x Odm. x Onc.).

In the current botanical classifications according to Genera Orchidacearum by Alec M. Pridgeon, Phillip J. Cribb, Mark W. Chase, and Finn N. Rasmussen, Odontoglossum and Cochlioda are almost completely merged into Oncidium and most of the x Wilsonara are considered to be interspecific crosses within Oncidium or some might be called x Cochlicidium for the Cochlioda x Oncidium hybrids.

References

Orchid nothogenera
Oncidiinae
Historically recognized angiosperm taxa